Betty Blake (September 20, 1931 – April 13, 1982) was an American historic preservationist and promoter. She was best known for preserving historic riverboats in Cincinnati. Her biggest preservation project was helping to save the Delta Queen.

Biography 
Blake was born on September 20, 1930 in Lexington, Kentucky and grew up in Carlisle, Kentucky. Blake was part of the campaign to help elect her father, Stanley Blake, to the Kentucky Senate in 1936. Blake attended the University of Kentucky and earned a degree in business in 1952. Blake's first job was working at WLW-TV in Cincinnati, and while she was there, applied to work as a salesperson for Avalon Steamboat Lines. When she applied for the job, the president said, "Look, this little lady wants to sell our boat. Isn't that wonderful?" Blake was successful at the job and when the company was sold to the Belle of Louisville, Blake went to the Greene Line Inc, as the public relations director for the Delta Queen in 1962.

The Delta Queen was "a floating hotel with a troubled occupancy rate" when she took over and was threatened by the federal Safety at Sea law which prohibited wooden vessels from carrying more than 50 passengers overnight. Blake promoted the Delta Queen using a steamboat race between the Queen and the Belle of Louisville in 1963. The race eventually became an annual attraction during Kentucky Derby Week. Blake helped the Queen reach around a 90% occupancy rate for is 188 bed-capacity. However, the Safety at Sea law threatened to put the boat in dry dock in 1966. Blake collected signatures for a petition to get a special act passed exempting the boat from the new law. Congress passed the special act, saving the boat. The exemptions were limited, with one passed on 1973, extending into October 31, 1978.  Blake also helped lead the campaign to have the boat listed on the National Register of Historic Places in 1970.

In 1975, Blake was one of two women on the board of trustees of the Greater Cincinnati Chamber of Commerce. When she was promoted to president of the Delta Queen Steamboat Company in 1976, she became the first woman to serve as the president of a major American cruise line. In 1979, Blake left the Delta Queen to open her own public relations and marketing firm called Betty Blake & Co. A 400-seat passenger boat, the Betty Blake, was named after her by on April 12, 1980.

Blake became ill in December 1981. She died from stomach cancer in Georgetown, Kentucky on April 13, 1982. Blake was buried in Carlisle Cemetery where her headstone reads only "Hi There." In 1996, Blake was inducted into the National Rivers Hall of Fame.

References

External links
 Betty Blake
 Hail to Capt. Betty, the Riverboat Queen

1931 births
1982 deaths
University of Kentucky alumni
People from Carlisle, Kentucky
Businesspeople from Cincinnati
American women business executives
Businesspeople from Lexington, Kentucky
20th-century American businesspeople
20th-century American businesswomen
Deaths from stomach cancer
Deaths from cancer in Kentucky